"Roun' the Globe" is the lead single by the Kentucky rap group Nappy Roots from their second studio album, Wooden Leather. The song peaked at number 96 on the U.S. pop chart. It was featured in the soundtrack for Madden NFL 2004 (the only place where the word "damn" is censored in the song; usually it is uncensored).

Track listing 
 Roun' the Globe (Explicit)
 Po Folks (Josh One Remix)
 Roun' the Globe (slump Mix Explicit)

Chart positions

Remixes
The official remix was done along with the Ying Yang Twins.

References

2003 singles
Nappy Roots songs